Michael Barnes (born October 21, 1968) is an American motorcycle racer.

Career statistics

By season

Races by year
(key)

References

External links
 

1968 births
Living people
American motorcycle racers
MotoGP World Championship riders